Frederick Johannes 'Fritz' van Heerden (born 29 June 1970) is a former South African rugby union player who played international rugby for the Springboks, making his debut on 4 June 1994 in Pretoria against the England touring side. Van Heerden played rugby with Western Province and Leicester Tigers.

Playing career
Van Heerden matriculated at Roodepoort High School in 1988 and represented  at the annual Craven Week tournament in 1988. In 1991 he enrolled for a law degree at the University of Stellenbosch and represented Maties on the rugby field. He made his senior provincial debut in July 1991, when he replaced the injured Gert Smal, in the  team. In 1996 he was named the Western Province captain.

He joined Leicester Tigers in 1997, following fellow South African Joel Stransky, and joining up with Martin Johnson, and replacing Matt Poole who acquired a knee injury at about the same time with Dean Richards (normally a number eight) playing lock.  Also able to play flanker, he complemented Johnson's more powerful play with mobility, but perhaps more importantly he pioneered the contesting of the opposition's line-out throws.

He returned to South Africa in 1999 to try to play for his country in the 1999 World Cup, and was drafted into the side late as a replacement for Selborne Boome, playing against Spain.  After the World Cup, he returned to Leicester where he helped in the development of England lock Ben Kay.  He retired.

Test history

See also
List of South Africa national rugby union players – Springbok no. 606

References

External links 
 Scrum.com
 Planet-rugby.com

1970 births
Living people
South African rugby union players
South Africa international rugby union players
Leicester Tigers players
Western Province (rugby union) players
Stellenbosch University alumni
Rugby union players from Gauteng
Rugby union flankers
Rugby union locks